Petar Drapšin (15 November 1914 – 2 November 1945) was a Yugoslav Partisan commander.

Early life and education
Drapšin was born to a family of poor peasant farmers in the village of Turija near Srbobran (Szenttamás), Austria-Hungary a few months into World War I. By the time he reached school age, the war ended, resulting in the Austro-Hungarian defeat and disintegration along with formation of a new state Kingdom of Serbs, Croats and Slovenes. 

He completed primary school in his village before going to nearby Srbobran for lower gymnasium studies.

He then moved to the country's capital Belgrade, apprenticing for a tradesman position. After completing his trade term, he enrolled in the streamlined technical high school where he first got introduced to the workers' movement ideas under the auspices of the Communist Party (KPJ), a political organization banned in the Kingdom of Yugoslavia. Active in the school's literary section that actively spread communist ideas, Drapšin also joined KPJ's youth wing SKOJ. 

In 1937 he went to Prague for university studies. 

Soon after that, he went to fight in the Spanish Civil War, joining the Republican side as one of the Yugoslav volunteers in the Spanish Civil War. He excelled in combat, earning the rank of captain in the process. After the demise of Second Spanish Republic, he was interned in France. From there he escaped to Zagreb in 1939.

World War II
In 1941, following the Axis invasion of Yugoslavia, Drapšin was given the task of organizing armed uprising in the Herzegovina region by the Yugoslav Communist Party (KPJ).

Savo Skoko (1923–2013), a historian who fought on the Partisan side during World War II, hailing from the Jugovići village near Gacko compiled a book of documents and first-hand accounts titled Krvavo kolo hercegovačko 1941-1942. Published in Podgorica in 1995, the book details crimes committed by the members of People's Liberation Movement against civilians in the Herzegovina region during World War II, and Petar Drapšin is mentioned as the organizer and perpetrator of a series of such crimes. After complaints within the revolutionary movement that the communists in Herzegovina are soft on "class enemies", various prominent war-tested communist leaders including Sava Kovačević and Drapšin were sent there in late 1941 and early 1942. As the commanding officers of the First Striking Battalion (Prvi udarni bataljon), their men executed 21 local villagers on 27 February 1942 on Radački brijeg. On 3 and 4 March 1942, an even bigger crime occurred when they rounded up and executed a total of 41 people from the Bileća-area villages of Golobrđe, Divljakuša, and Meka Gruda. To strengthen the psychological effect on the rest of the villagers they then proceeded to completely dehumanize their victims by dancing and celebrating around their corpses while the family members wailed.

Drapšin's conduct in Herzegovina got him sharp criticism from the party leadership as well as disciplinary action. However, in January 1943, the party gave him another chance by appointing him the commander of Yugoslav National Liberation Army's (YNLA) 12th Slavonian Division. Two months later he received the rank of major general. In May 1944 he became commander of YNLA's 8th Corps. During summer 1944, Drapšin became deputy commander of the Croatian National Liberation Army (NOVH), the Croatian branch of YNLA.

In December 1944 Drapšin was sent to Dalmatia to command YNLA's 8th Corps. In January 1945 he received the rank of lieutenant general. Units under his command halted German offensive in Dalmatian hinterland in January 1945 and liberated Herzegovina during the Mostar Operation.

Soon after that the 8th Corps got transformed into the 4th Army, which began the Lika-Primorje operation, an offensive against the remaining Axis forces in Yugoslavia in late March 1945. Despite difficult terrain and need for complicated amphibious operation, Drapšin's force scored spectacular success by piercing through enemy lines in Lika, defeating German forces in the Rijeka operation, landing in Istria and entering Trieste before Allied forces. This Partisan offensive was arguably the most important in the history of Yugoslavia, because it allowed Istria, Rijeka and Slovene Littoral to become part of SFR Yugoslavia, later Croatia and Slovenia.

After the war Drapšin was entered as candidate for the National Assembly at the post-war elections.

Death 
Details surrounding Drapšin's untimely death are uncertain. There are contradictory accounts about his death on 2 November 1945. The official version attributes the cause of death to an accidentally discharged pistol. Other stories tell about Drapšin being criticised at a party meeting and committing suicide afterwards.

In his book, Skoko describes Drapšin as a "psychologically unstable person whose condition bordered on complete insanity". Skoko also disputes the official communist version of Drapšin's death and claims that he committed suicide.

In 1953, he posthumously received the honour of the People's Hero of Yugoslavia.

See also
Yugoslav volunteers in the Spanish Civil War

References

1914 births
1945 deaths
People from Srbobran
Serbian generals
Yugoslav Partisans members
Yugoslav communists
Yugoslav people of the Spanish Civil War
Serbian people of World War II
Recipients of the Order of the People's Hero
Generals of the Yugoslav People's Army
Suicides by firearm in Serbia
Suicides in Yugoslavia